The following lists events that happened during 2015 in Cameroon.

Incumbents
 President: Paul Biya
 Prime Minister: Philémon Yang

Events

January
 January 2 - Boko Haram militants attack a bus in Waza killing eleven people and injuring six.
 January 12 - Cameroon kills 143 Boko Haram fighters in clashes.
 January 15 - The Military of Chad enters Cameroon to assist in fighting against Boko Haram insurgents.
 January 17 - Following the Chad authorities decision to send troops to Nigeria and Cameroon to fight Boko Haram militants, the Russian ambassador to the country pledges to supply Cameroon with more modern weapons to combat the Islamist insurgents.
 January 18 - Boko Haram militants kidnap 80 people and kill three others from villages in north Cameroon.

References

 
2010s in Cameroon
Years of the 21st century in Cameroon
Cameroon
Cameroon